The Dangerous Transmission is the title of a Hardy Boys Digest novel, credited to Franklin W. Dixon.

While on holiday in London, the Hardy Boys pursue a notorious spy who has stolen their friend's new invention – a voice transmitter that can be implanted in a tooth.

The Hardy Boys books
2004 American novels
2004 children's books
Novels set in London
Aladdin Paperbacks books